Oligoaeschna kunigamiensis is a species of dragonfly in the family Aeshnidae. It is endemic to Japan.

References

Insects of Japan
Aeshnidae
Taxonomy articles created by Polbot
Taxobox binomials not recognized by IUCN